The Jewish News may refer to:

 Jewish News of London
 Cleveland Jewish News
 The Detroit Jewish News
 New Jersey Jewish News
 J. The Jewish News of Northern California, published since 1895